The Kelly–Hopkinsville encounter (also known as the Hopkinsville Goblins Case or Kelly Green Men Case) was a claimed close encounter with extraterrestrial beings in 1955 near the communities of Kelly and Hopkinsville in Christian County, Kentucky, United States. UFOlogists regard it as one of the most significant and well-documented cases in the history of UFO incidents, while skeptics say the reports were due to "the effects of excitement" and misidentification of natural phenomena such as meteors and owls. The United States Air Force classified the alleged incident as a hoax in the Project Blue Book files.

Psychologists have used the alleged incident as an academic example of pseudoscience to help students distinguish truth from fiction.

Claims

On the evening of August 21, 1955, five adults and seven children arrived at the Hopkinsville police station claiming that small alien creatures from a spaceship were attacking their farmhouse, and that they had been holding them off with gunfire "for nearly four hours". Two of the adults, Elmer Sutton and Billy Ray Taylor, claimed they had been shooting at "twelve to fifteen" short, dark figures who repeatedly popped up at the doorway or peered into the windows.

Concerned about a possible gun battle between local citizens, four city police, five state troopers, three deputy sheriffs, and four military police from the nearby US Army Fort Campbell drove to the Sutton farmhouse located near the town of Kelly in Christian County. Their search yielded nothing apart from evidence of gunfire and holes in window and door screens made by firearms.

Residents of the farmhouse included Glennie Lankford, her children, Lonnie, Charlton, and Mary, two sons from a previous marriage, Elmer "Lucky" Sutton, John Charley "J.C." Sutton, their respective wives Vera and Alene, Alene's brother O.P. Baker, and Billy Ray Taylor and his wife June. Both the Taylors, "Lucky", and Vera Sutton were reportedly itinerant carnival workers who were visiting the farmhouse. The next day, neighbors told two officers that the families had "packed up and left" after claiming "the creatures had returned about 3:30 in the morning".

Press coverage
The family's claims received widespread coverage in local and national press. Early articles did not refer to "little green men"; the color was later added to some newspaper stories.

Explanations

Psychologists Rodney Schmaltz and Scott Lilienfeld cite the alleged incident as an example of pseudoscience and an "extraordinary claim" to help students develop critical thinking skills. Although contemporary newspaper stories alleged that "all officials appeared to agree that there was no drinking involved", Schmaltz and Lilienfeld suggest that intoxication may have played a part in the sighting. 

Committee for Skeptical Inquiry member and skeptic Joe Nickell notes that the family could have misidentified "eagle owls" or great horned owls, which are nocturnal, fly silently, have yellow eyes, and aggressively defend their nests. According to Nickell, meteor sightings also occurred at the time that could explain Billy Ray Taylor's claim that he saw "a bright light streak across the sky and disappear beyond a tree line some distance from the house".

Author Brian Dunning noted that the height of the owls would be comparable to at least the lower end of the reported range of around : "There are simply too many similarities between the creatures reported by the families and an aggressive pair of the local Great Horned Owls, which do stand about two-thirds of a meter tall."

UFOlogists
French UFOlogist Renaud Leclet also argued in a publication that the best explanation of the case is great horned owls.

UFOlogist Jerome Clark writes that the supposed creatures "floated" through the trees and the sound of bullets striking them "resembled bullets striking a metal bucket". Clark describes "an odd luminous patch along a fence where one of the beings had been shot, and, in the woods beyond, a green light whose source could not be determined"; however, this description was consistent with foxfire, a bioluminescent fungus on decaying wood.

Clark also wrote that investigations by "police, Air Force officers from nearby Fort Campbell, and civilian ufologists found no evidence of a hoax"; however, Brian Dunning reported: "The claim that Air Force investigators showed up the next day at Mrs. Lankford's house has been published a number of times by later authors, but I could find no corroborating evidence of this." Dunning also observed: "The four military police who accompanied the police officers on the night of the event were from an Army base, not an Air Force base."

Some UFOlogists compared the alleged creatures to gremlins, which have since often been referred to as the "Hopkinsville Goblins" in popular culture. UFOlogist Allan Hendry wrote: "This case is distinguished by its duration and also by the number of witnesses involved." Project Blue Book listed the case as a hoax with no further comment.

In popular culture
The event is at the origin of the popularization of the words "little green men". Prior to this sighting, flying saucer occupants were called "little men"; "little green men" were limited to the science-fiction culture, in particular the Mack Reynolds story The Case of the Little Green Men (1951) and in Fredric Brown's Martians Go Home (1955). The day following the alleged sighting, however, local reporters started to call the creatures "little green men", and the words were soon reproduced in many newspapers, quoted on the radio, and translated into other languages.

In the late 1970s, Steven Spielberg used the event as the basis for Night Skies, an unproduced science fiction horror film.

The 1986 comedy-horror film Critters is loosely based on the event.

The Pokémon Sableye, introduced in Pokémon Ruby & Sapphire, is based on the goblins described in the event. In the games, they are animated with a swaying or "wading" motion, based on the creatures' reported gait.

In the Pathfinder Roleplaying Game, the "hobkins", a type of gremlin from the Bestiary 5 book, is based upon the goblins described in the event.

The event was the basis for the Annoyance Theater's musical "It Came From Kentucky" in Chicago.

A February 2020 episode of the American television series Project Blue Book  focused on the event.

The Kelly community celebrates the event annually with the Little Green Men Days Festival.

See also
 List of UFO sightings
 Goblin

References

External links
 Episode 137: American Goblins – Part 2: Joe Nickel interview about the event on the podcast Monster Talk

Christian County, Kentucky
UFO sightings in the United States
1955 in Kentucky
August 1955 events in the United States